Going East is an album by soul singer Billy Paul. The album was arranged by Bobby Martin, Lenny Pakula and Thom Bell.

Reception

Released in 1971, this would be Paul's Philadelphia International Records debut after recording his first two albums for Kenny Gamble and Leon Huff's Neptune and Gamble labels. Gamble recalled: 

Paul's 10:21 live version of "East" appears on the 2011 Legacy CD Golden Gate Groove: The Sound of Philadelphia Live in San Francisco 1973 - a record company event recorded on 27 June 1973 at the Fairmont Hotel. Paul and other PIR acts were backed by MFSB which featured 35 musicians including Leon Huff on organ. Paul's performance of "Me and Mrs. Jones" (8:34) from the event also appears on the album.

Track listing
"East" - (Tyrone W. Brown)  6:46
"(If You Let Me Make Love to You Then) Why Can't I Touch You?" - (Charles Courtney, Peter Link)  2:42
"This Is Your Life" - (Jimmy Webb)  4:16
"Jesus Boy (You Only Look Like a Man)" - (Moh Jakke)  4:17
"Magic Carpet Ride" - (J. Cohn, R. Green, C. Makem)  5:19
"I Wish It Were Yesterday" - (Bobby Martin, Lee Phillips)  3:50
"Compared to What" - (Gene McDaniels)  5:20
"Love Buddies" - (Kenny Gamble, Leon Huff)  3:40
"There's a Small Hotel" - (Lorenz Hart, Richard Rodgers)  4:27

Personnel
Billy Paul - lead and backing vocals
Norman Harris, Roland Chambers - guitar
Eddie Green - piano
Vince Montana - vibraphone
Tyrone Brown - bass
Norman Farrington - drums
Tony Williams - flute, saxophone
Robert Crippen - congas
Charles Jules, Gerald Roberts - shekere percussion
Don Renaldo and his String Section - strings
Sam Reed and his Horns - horns
Bobby Martin (tracks: B2 to B5), Lenny Pakula (tracks: A1), Thom Bell (tracks: A2 to B1) - string and horn arrangements

Charts

References

External links
 Billy Paul-Going East at Discogs

1971 albums
Billy Paul albums
Albums produced by Kenneth Gamble
Albums produced by Leon Huff
Albums arranged by Thom Bell
Albums arranged by Bobby Martin
Albums recorded at Sigma Sound Studios
Philadelphia International Records albums